The Royal Fleet Auxiliary (RFA) is a naval auxiliary fleet owned by the UK's Ministry of Defence.  It provides logistical and operational support to the Royal Navy and Royal Marines.  The RFA ensures the Royal Navy is supplied and supported by providing fuel and stores through replenishment at sea, transporting Royal Marines and British Army personnel, providing medical care and transporting equipment and essentials around the world. In addition the RFA acts independently providing humanitarian aid, counter piracy and counter narcotic patrols together with assisting the Royal Navy in preventing conflict and securing international trade. They are a uniformed civilian branch of the Royal Navy staffed by British merchant sailors.

RFA personnel are civilian employees of the Ministry of Defence and members of the Royal Naval Reserve and Sponsored Reserves. Although RFA personnel wear Merchant Navy rank insignia with naval uniforms, they are part of the Royal Navy. RFA vessels are commanded and crewed by these sailors, augmented with regular and reserve Royal Navy personnel who perform specialised functions such as operating and maintaining helicopters or providing hospital facilities. Royal Navy personnel are also needed to operate certain weapons, such as the Phalanx; however, other weapons (such as the DS30B 30 mm cannon) are operated by RFA personnel. The RFA counts an aviation training ship/hospital ship and landing vessels amongst its assets.

History

The RFA was first established in 1905 to provide coaling ships for the Navy in an era when the change from sail to coal-fired steam engines as the main means of propulsion meant that a network of bases around the world with coaling facilities or a fleet of ships able to supply coal were necessary for a fleet to operate away from its home country. Since the Royal Navy of that era possessed the largest network of bases around the world of any fleet, the RFA at first took a relatively minor role.

The RFA first became heavily relied upon by the Royal Navy during World War II, when the British fleet was often far from available bases, either due to the enemy capturing such bases, or, in the Pacific, because of the sheer distances involved. World War II also saw naval ships staying at sea for much longer periods than had been the case since the days of sail. Techniques of Replenishment at Sea (RAS) were developed. The auxiliary fleet comprised a diverse collection, with not only RFA ships, but also commissioned warships and merchantmen as well. The need for the fleet to be maintained was unambiguously demonstrated by World War II.

After 1945, the RFA became the Royal Navy's main source of support in the many conflicts that the Navy was involved in. The RFA performed important service to the Far East Fleet off Korea from 1950 until 1953, when sustained carrier operations were again mounted in Pacific waters. During the extended operations of the Konfrontasi in the 1960s, the RFA was also heavily involved. As the network of British bases overseas shrank during the end of the Empire, the Navy increasingly relied on the RFA to supply its ships during routine deployments.

The RFA played an important role in the largest naval war since 1945, the Falklands War in 1982 (where one vessel was lost and another badly damaged), and also the Gulf War, Kosovo War, Afghanistan Campaign and the 2003 invasion of Iraq.

In July 2008, the RFA was presented with a Queen's Colour, an honour unique to a civilian organisation.

Fleet

Ships in RFA service carry the ship prefix RFA, standing for Royal Fleet Auxiliary, and fly the Blue Ensign defaced with an upright gold killick anchor. All Royal Fleet Auxiliaries are built and maintained to Lloyd's Register and Department for Transport standards.

The most important role provided by the RFA is replenishment at sea (RAS), therefore the mainstay of the current RFA fleet are the replenishment ships.

The  are designated 'Fleet Tankers', which primarily provide under way refuelling to Royal Navy ships, but can also provide a limited amount of dry cargo. The  are designated 'Fast Fleet Tankers' that were ordered in February 2012. The four tankers have been ordered from DSME, South Korea with design support from Britain's BMT Defence Services, the first of which  entered service in 2017. From 2022, only the Tide class were to be active with both Wave-class vessels being placed in extended readiness (uncrewed reserve).

 is a 'one-stop' replenishment ship, capable of providing under way refuelling and dry cargo (i.e. rearming, victualling and spares). Until 2011, she had a sister ship in  until she was decommissioned as a result of defence cuts. Two ships of the  also provided dry stores replenishment but were placed into extended readiness in 2020. The two ships were later decommissioned, leaving Fort Victoria the only fleet solid support ship in service. A class of three new fleet solid support ships are expected to arrive between 20282032 under the Fleet Solid Support Ship Programme. The manufacturing contract for this acquisition, valued at 1.6 billion pounds, was signed in January 2023.

The Wave class, Tide class and Fort Victoria incorporate aviation facilities, providing aviation support and training facilities as well as vertical replenishment capabilities. They are capable of operating and supporting Merlin and Lynx Wildcat helicopters, both of which are significant weapons platforms. The presence of aviation facilities on RFA ships allows for them to be used as 'force multipliers' for the task groups they support in line with Royal Navy doctrine.

The RFA is tasked with the role of supporting Royal Navy amphibious operations through its three  dock landing ships (LSD). Typically one Bay-class vessel (as of 2023 RFA Cardigan Bay) is also assigned as a permanent 'mothership' for Royal Navy mine countermeasures vessels in the Persian Gulf. The 2021 defence white paper proposed the acquisition of a new class of up to six Multi-Role Support Ships to support littoral strike operations. These seemed likely to replace the Bay-class ships by the 2030s. In the interim, the white paper had proposed to upgrade one of the Bay-class vessels with permanent hangar facilities in order to carry out the littoral strike role. However, in July 2022 it was reported that the future Littoral Strike Role would in fact be assumed by RFA Argus after a refit to convert her to this role.

Argus is a unique support ship in the RFA. She is currently tasked with peacetime aviation training and support. On active operations, she becomes the Primary Casualty Receiving Ship (PCRS); essentially a hospital ship. She cannot be described as such – and is not afforded such protection under the Geneva Convention – as she is armed. She can, however, venture into waters too dangerous for a normal hospital ship. Argus completed a refit in May 2007 intended to extend her operational life to 2020. As of 2022 Defence Procurement Minister Jeremy Quin indicated that it was planned to retain the ship in service beyond 2030 rather than retiring her in 2024 as previously planned. The 2021 defence white paper did not specifically mention her replacement. However, Minister Quinn indicated that her functions are projected as likely to be taken over by the new Multi-Role Vessels, approved for acquisition in the 2021 defence white paper.

The RFA is in the process of acquiring two Multi-Role Ocean Surveillance Ships. The ships will be used to protect undersea critical national infrastructure, such as gas pipelines and undersea cables. In January 2023, the first vessel for this role - MV Topaz Tangaroa - was acquired and is to enter service as RFA Proteus. She was purchased for some 70 million pounds and is to be converted to act as a mothership for autonomous systems and have military communications and light defensive armament added. It is reported that a second MROS ship is envisaged, which is to be a new build vessel and as of 2023 is in the concept stage.

In December 2022, it was reported that a commercial vessel was being sought for the Royal Fleet Auxiliary which would act as a mothership for autonomous mine hunting systems. The new vessel, to be named RFA Stirling Castle, is the former offshore support vessel MV Island Crown which, after her entry into service, is likely be based at the Clyde naval base. The ship was purchased for 40 million pounds and arrived at HMNB Devonport in January 2023. Her conversion was not anticipated to be lengthy and it was reported that she would be in service by Spring 2023. In due course two additional ships, and a total of six mission systems, will also be acquired, one of which is intended to replace RFA Cardigan Bay and some of the other vessels in 9 Mine Countermeasures Squadron operating from HMS Jufair in Bahrain. Cardigan Bay would then be returned to a primary amphibious operations role.

The s were acquired in 2002 under a £1.25bn private finance initiative with Foreland Shipping known as the Strategic Sealift Service. These ships are Merchant Navy vessels leased to the Ministry of Defence (MoD) as and when needed. Originally six ships were part of the deal, allowing the MoD use of four of the ships with two being made available for commercial charter, these latter two were released from the contract in 2012. The MoD also contracts to secure fuel supplies for facilities overseas. For sometime this requirement was maintained through charter of the vessel . The ship was tasked with supplying fuel to the United Kingdoms various naval establishments at home and overseas, as well as providing aviation fuel to RAF stations at Cyprus, Ascension Island and the Falkland Islands. The MoD chartered the vessel to commercial companies during periods where she was not in use for defence purposes. Since the end of the contract for the use of Maersk Rapier, a further contract for the use of another tanker, renamed the Raleigh Fisher, has been secured.

As of 2023, there are 13 ships in service with the Royal Fleet Auxiliary with a total displacement of approximately 341,000 tonnes. These figures include vessels being converted to join the fleet during 2023 but exclude merchant navy vessels under charter to the Ministry of Defence.

Replenishment

Dock landing ships

Aviation support/casualty evacuation

Multi-Role Ocean Surveillance (MROS) Ship

Mine Countermeasures Command and  Support Vessel

Ministry of Defence sealift/supply vessels
 Not part of the RFA, under charter to the MoD

Rank insignia

Officers
Rank insignia of RFA officers are the same as for the other Royal Navy branches; however, the RFA makes use of the diamond used by merchant shipping rather than the loop used by the RN.
The rank of commodore is the most senior in the RFA.

Department Colours

The RFA uses distinctive cloth to distinguish the branch of its officers.  The Royal Navy ceased this practice for most officers in 1955, with the exception of medical and dental officers who are denoted by red and orange cloth respectively.

Marine Engineers may also have maroon coloured cloth in place of purple.

Crew

Uniforms
Officers and Ratings of the RFA wear similar uniforms to the regular navy with RFA distinguishing marks.

No. 1 Dress

This is the formal uniform worn on ceremonial occasions. For all officers it consists of a double-breasted, navy blue reefer jacket with four rows of two RFA buttons; matching trousers; white shirt and black tie; peaked cap; and black leather shoes. Rank insignia is denoted on the lower sleeve.

For ratings this uniform is a single breasted tunic fastened with four RFA buttons, with flapped chest pockets and hip pockets; white shirt and black tie, peaked cap for Petty Officers and above and a light blue beret for other ratings; and black leather shoes. Rank insignia is denoted on the lower sleeve.

No. 2 Dress

Number 2A dress is the formal evening dress for ceremonial dinners; it consists of a navy blue mess jacket with a white waistcoat (black cummerbund for female officers) with miniature medals. 
2B is "mess undress" for other mess functions, and is worn with either a black cummerbund or navy blue waistcoat and miniature medals. 2C, "red sea rig", is worn for informal evening wear on board ship; it consists of a white short sleeved shirt, worn with shoulderboards, without medals and with black trousers, black shoes and a black cummerbund.

No. 3 Dress
This is worn all year round for general duties. It consists of a white shirt with rank insignia on the shoulders, and appropriate headgear. For officers 3A dress includes a long-sleeved shirt and tie, while 3B includes a short-sleeved shirt worn with hard shoulder boards. 3C is the same in all respects as 3A but with the addition of a navy blue woollen jersey.
This is the same as for Officer's No. 3 dress but with the relevant rate insignia and beret. Junior rates are only issued with short-sleeve shirts and are not issued with ties. Thus No.3 dress is divided into 3B (without jersey) and 3C dress (navy-blue jersey worn over the shirt with the shirt collar out). There is no equivalent of 3A dress for junior ratings.

No. 4 Dress
Number 4 dress is the working uniform of the RFA. It is referred to as Royal Fleet Auxiliary Personal Clothing System (RFAPCS); it consists of a navy blue fire-retardant jacket, navy blue baseball cap, navy blue stable belt, navy-blue fire-retardant trousers, dms boots, black T-shirt and an optional navy-blue microfleece.
Number 4R dress is the same only without the jacket and with an optional baseball cap.
RFAPCS is distinguished from its RNPCS counterpart by the RFA blue ensign and 'ROYAL FLEET AUXILIARY' tape replacing the white ensign and 'ROYAL NAVY' tape worn on the left arm and left chest pocket respectively. 
Junior ratings may also wear an RFA badged baseball cap in this order of dress, whilst undertaking courses at Royal Navy establishments.

No. 5 Dress
Number 5 dress is the collective category for all specialist working uniforms. They are worn as required for duties.

Recruitment and training 
The RFA recruits ratings either directly from industry (or where they are suitably trained to allow direct entry), or as apprentices whilst undertaking training.

Officers are recruited in one of three ways:

 direct from industry (or where they are suitably trained to allow direct entry)
 via the RTO (rating-to-officer) programme
 as cadets

All new officers take part in a 10-week Initial Naval Training Officers (INT-O) course at BRNC Dartmouth that is designed to familiarise new officers to the RFA and develop leadership skills.

List of Commodores Royal Fleet Auxiliary

The post of Commodore of the Royal Fleet Auxiliary (COMRFA) was created in 1951, known as Commodore RFA and Deputy Director Royal Navy Afloat Support  since 2020, is the senior officer of the RFA. The following people have served as COMRFA:

 1951–1954: Stanley Kent 
 1954–1955: William Browne
 1955–1957: Thomas Card
 1957–1962: Thomas Elder
 1962–1964: Albert Curtain
 1964–1966: Eric Payne 
 1966–1968: Griffith Evans
 1968–1971: Joe Dines
 1971–1972: Henry L'Estrange 
 1972–1977: George Robson
 1977–1983: Samuel Dunlop
 1983–1985: James Coull
 1986–1989: Barry Rutterford
 1989–1994: Richard Thorn
 1994–1999: Norman Squire 
 1999–2003: Peter Lannin
 2003–2008: Robert Thornton
 2008–2013: Bill Walworth
 2013–2015: Rob Dorey
 2015–2020: Duncan Lamb
 2020–present: David Eagles

See also

Lists of ships operated by or in support of His Majesty's Naval Service
 List of active Royal Navy ships
 List of active Royal Marines military watercraft
 List of ships of Serco Marine Services

Related articles
 His Majesty's Naval Service
 List of Royal Fleet Auxiliary ship names
 Merchant Navy (United Kingdom)
 Royal Research Ship
 Military Sealift Command – the United States Navy's analogue to the Royal Fleet Auxiliary
 Solid Support Ship

Notes

References

Bibliography
The Royal Fleet Auxiliary – A Century of Service. Adams/Smith. London 2005. Chatham Publishing. .

External links 
 
 RFA Association Photo Archive (rfaaplymouth.org)
 The Marine Society provides a crew library service and education services to serving Merchant Navy and Royal Navy personnel.
 History of the RFA (historicalrfa.org)

 
British Merchant Navy
1905 establishments in the United Kingdom
Naval Service
Royal Navy
F